Carola Josefine Sundström Lindberg, (born 6 September 1976) in Upplands Väsby is a Swedish television host, author and singer. Sundström participated in Melodifestivalen 1999 with the girlgroup Ai with the song "Bilder av dej". The same year she started working for SVT and hosted the musicvideo show "Voxpop" for several years and she also hosted Melodifestivalen 2001. She also hosted Lilla Melodifestivalen 2002 on SVT.

Sundström was the Swedish commentator during the Eurovision Song Contest 2013 broadcast on SVT. Josefine Sundström was the Swedish spokesperson at Eurovision Song Contest 2001 and announced the countries voting result. Sundström is also an author having released two books Vinteräpplen in 2010 and Boel och Oscar in 2012.

TV shows 
 1997–1999 – Bingolotto, TV 4 (acting as "Bingo-Berra")
 1999–2002 – Voxpop / Voxtop, SVT
 2001 – Melodifestivalen, SVT (Host)
 2000–2001 – Jukebox, SVT (host)
 2002 – Junior-Jeopardy!, TV 4
 2002 – Diggiloo, SVT (Guest in 2002)
 2003 – När & fjärran, TV 4
 DunkaDunka, TV 4
 2003–2005 – Combo, SVT
 2004 – Säpop, SVT
 2005 – Klara, färdiga, gå!
 2007 – Lilla Melodifestivalen, SVT (host)
 2008 – Stjärnor på is, TV4 (participant)

Bibliography
 Vinteräpplen – 2010 
 Boel och Oscar – 2012

References

Swedish television hosts
21st-century Swedish women writers
People from Upplands Väsby Municipality
1976 births
Living people
21st-century Swedish singers
21st-century Swedish women singers
Swedish women television presenters
Melodifestivalen contestants of 1999